(recursive acronym for Kosmos Obey Strategical Multiple Operation System) is a fictional character from the Xenosaga role-playing video game series by Monolith Soft and Bandai Namco Entertainment. KOS-MOS also appears as a major character in the anime Xenosaga: The Animation and in several crossover video games.

Appearances

In the Xenosaga series

KOS-MOS is an armored female android developed by the interstellar conglomerate, Vector Industries. She is made entirely of mechanical parts and nanomachines. She is programmed based on the tenets of logic, probability, and the completion of her assigned mission. However, threats to the physical safety of her co-creator, Shion Uzuki, cause KOS-MOS to temporarily ignore these parameters. She is equipped with a "Simulated Personality OS" to aid in communication, although she appears incapable of emotion.

KOS-MOS has significant powers believed to be superior to all other party members. In addition to superhuman strength and speed, the nanomachines her body is formed from allow her to morph parts of her body (specifically her arms) into various energy projectile and melee weapons. Her body is also able to self-repair and is very durable though not indestructible, and she is also protected by a force shield. She also possesses the ability to summon weapons such as the F-GSHOT chainguns and her famous F-SCYTHE and equipment from another location via U.M.N. transport. She also has a long-range sensory array, the D.S.S.S. system, and CPU that exceeds even those possessed by Observational Realians. She also possesses a Hilbert Effect projector whose power is thousands of times greater than that achieved by even the largest spaceships.

KOS-MOS possesses several black box components left behind by Kevin Winnicot. Each of these black box features is found in each of her skeletons, Version 1, Version 2, Version 3 and Version 4. One of these is her potent X-BUSTER weapon, a powerful burst of energy beams from her abdomen that absorbs the Gnosis.  Others are related to her "simulated personality" OS and her self-awareness. KOS-MOS also has some form of energy manipulation tied to the Zohar.  KOS-MOS has another weapon system called the "Tertiary Weapon System", which is seen periodically throughout the series. They consist of a set of energy wings, a pair of energy cannons and other attachments meant to be fitted onto her. While she is programmed to protect Vector personnel unconditionally, her highest priority is to protect Shion specifically.

An almost human alternate persona tends to come out from time to time in the form of a blue-eyed KOS-MOS.  This blue-eyed KOS-MOS is far more powerful than red-eyed KOS-MOS and talks in a more empathetic human-sounding voice.  This alternate KOS-MOS is in fact KOS-MOS' true personality that partially awakens at times when Shion is in extreme danger.

Other appearances
KOS-MOS is one of many playable characters in the 2005 tactical role-playing game Namco × Capcom, along with M.O.M.O. and Shion also from Xenosaga. In 2008, she appeared as one of playable characters in the role-playing game Super Robot Taisen OG Saga: Endless Frontier. That same year, KOS-MOS made a cameo appearance in the role-playing game Tales of Hearts, where she is one of many supporting attack characters for the player. In 2010, she appeared as a playable character in Super Robot Taisen OG Saga: Endless Frontier Exceed. In 2012, she appeared as a playable character in the tactical role-playing game Project X Zone, as well as the 2015 sequel.

In 2005, she was included in the fighting game Soulcalibur III as a hidden playable character, available only if the player completes her costume and then creates a custom character. In the 2008 role-playing game Tales of Vesperia, KOS-MOS costume is available as a downloadable content for the character Judith in the PlayStation 3 version. In the 2017 Xeno series entry Xenoblade Chronicles 2, KOS-MOS appears as one of the Rare Blades, an in-game anthropomorphic weapon obtainable via Core Crystals.  KOS-MOS has a very low rate of appearance.

The limited edition of Xenosaga: Episode II included a figure of KOS-MOS dubbed "Jashin MOK-KOS" ("Evil God MOK-KOS"). Numerous other figures and figurines of KOS-MOS in various scales have been released in Japan, most of them are produced by the company Bandai. In 2013, Volks released a licensed 60 cm fashion doll of KOS-MOS Version 4, which was only available for purchase by a limited preorder.

Reception

KOS-MOS was well received by gaming media outlets. In 2009, GameDaily placed her 25th on their ranking of top video game robots, stating "KOS-MOS is quite a looker, but she needs a personality" and suggested her to "download some emotions."

In 2008, IGN listed her as third top Soul series bonus character for her cameo appearance in Soulcalibur III.  In 2010, she was included on UGO's list of top 25 Japanese RPG characters her for being "widely regarded as one of the most awesome characters to ever come out of Monolith's design department." That same year, Tim Turi of Game Informer chose KOS-MOS as one of the 20 Namco characters they would like to see in a rumored crossover fighting game Namco Vs Capcom. In 2012, Complex included "Capcom vs. Namco" on the list of fighting game crossovers they would like to see the most, featuring KOS-MOS on Namco's side.

In 2011, Lisa Foiles of The Escapist listed her among the top five robots in games. Matt Miller of Game Informer ranked her as the third top AI character of the 2000s, stating she  "rises above as a powerhouse that can’t be forgotten."

References

Artificial intelligence characters in video games
Deity characters in video games
Female characters in video games
Fictional goddesses
Fictional gynoids
Namco protagonists
Robot characters in video games
Video game characters introduced in 2002
Video game mascots
Weapons of mass destruction in fiction
Woman soldier and warrior characters in video games
Xenosaga characters
Science fiction weapons